Santiago Enrique Bustos (born 25 March 1998) is an Argentine professional footballer who plays as a left-back for Deportivo Lara.

Career
Bustos began his career in Primera B Metropolitana with All Boys, after he joined their youth system from San Lorenzo in 2018. He made his professional debut during a 0–0 draw with Flandria on 21 April 2019, as he played the full duration under manager Pablo Solchaga.

Career statistics
.

References

External links

1998 births
Living people
Argentine footballers
Argentine expatriate footballers
Sportspeople from Buenos Aires Province
Association football defenders
Primera B Metropolitana players
Paraguayan Primera División players
Venezuelan Primera División players
Club Atlético Vélez Sarsfield footballers
San Lorenzo de Almagro footballers
All Boys footballers
San Telmo footballers
Club Atlético Temperley footballers
Asociación Civil Deportivo Lara players
Argentine expatriate sportspeople in Paraguay
Argentine expatriate sportspeople in Venezuela
Expatriate footballers in Paraguay
Expatriate footballers in Venezuela